Democratic Vanguard Party (in Spanish: Partido Vanguardia Democrática), was a political party in Peru. Its general secretary was H. Merel.

Defunct political parties in Peru
Political parties with year of disestablishment missing
Political parties with year of establishment missing